The Carmen Saliare is a fragment of archaic Latin, which played a part in the rituals performed by the Salii (Salian priests, a.k.a. "leaping priests") of Ancient Rome. There are 35 extant fragments of the Carmen Saliare, which can be read in Morel's FPL.

The rituals revolved around Mars and Quirinus, and were performed in March and October.  These involved processions in which they donned archaic armour and weapons, performed their sacred dance, and sang the Carmen Saliare.  As a body they existed before the founding of the Roman Republic, tracing their origin back to the reign of Numa Pompilius.  The Salian priests were chosen from the sons of patrician families whose parents were still living. They were appointed for life, though they were allowed to resign from the Salian priesthood if they achieved a more prestigious priesthood or a major magistracy.

In the Annales written by Roman historian Tacitus, it is revealed that several Romans proposed the name of Germanicus to be added to the Salian Song, as a memory of his virtue and goodwill.

Fragments
Two fragments which have been preserved by Marcus Terentius Varro in his De Lingua Latina, 7.26, 27 (fragment 2 and 1 by Maurenbrecher's numbering):

The mysterious cozeulodorieso has attracted several proposals. Julius Pomponius Laetus proposed in his editio princeps the interpretation osculo dolori ero "I shall be as a kiss to grief", though his emendations are now dismissed as "editorial fantasy".  George Hempl restored it more carefully to coceulod orieso, attested in some manuscripts aside from the spacing, which is good archaic Latin for classical cucūlō oriēre "(thou shalt) come forth with the cuckoo".

A fragment preserved by Quintus Terentius Scaurus in his De orthographia (fragment 6 by Maurenbrecher's numbering):

An excerpt of it:

See also
Carmen (verse)
Carmen Arvale

Notes

References

External links
 B. Maurenbrecher:
 Carminum Saliarium reliquiae edidit B. Maurenbrecher; in: Jahrbücher für classische Philologie. Herausgegeben von Alfred Fleckeisen. Einundzwanzigster Supplementband. Mit einer Karte. Druck und Verlag von B. G. Teubner, Leipzig, 1894, p. 313ff. (IA)
 Carminum Saliarium reliquiae edidit B. Maurenbrecher. Commentatio ex supplemento uno et vicesimo Annalium Philologicorum seorsum expressa. Lipsiae in aedibus B. G. Teubneri. MDCCCXCIV [1894] (IA)
 George Hempl:
 III.—The Origin of the Latin Letters G and Z. By Prof. George Hempl, in: Transactions and Proceedings of the American Philological Association. 1899. Volume XXX, pp. 26 & 39f. (JSTOR):
 XII.—The Salian Hymn to Janus. By Prof. George Hempl, in: Transactions and Proceedings of the American Philological Association. 1900. Volume XXXI, pp. 182ff. (JSTOR, IA, google-US)
 Carmen Saliare (Bibliotheca Augustana)

Ancient Roman religion